Hemiphyllodactylus indosobrinus is a species of gecko. It is endemic to Laos.

References

Hemiphyllodactylus
Reptiles described in 2019
Endemic fauna of Laos
Reptiles of Laos